Andada is a census town in Bharuch district  in the state of Gujarat, India.

Demographics
 India census, Andada had a population of 13,506. Males constituted 54% of the population and females 46%. Andada has an average literacy rate of 73%, higher than the national average of 59.5%; with 57% of the males and 43% of females literate. 16% of the population is under 6 years of age.

References

Cities and towns in Bharuch district